The 2017–18 Purdue Boilermakers men's basketball team represented Purdue University in the 2017–18 NCAA Division I men's basketball season. Their head coach was Matt Painter, in his 13th season with the Boilers. The team played their home games in Mackey Arena in West Lafayette, Indiana as members of the Big Ten Conference. The Boilermakers finished the season 30–7, 15–3 in Big Ten play to finish in a tie for second place. As the No. 3 seed in the Big Ten tournament, they defeated Rutgers and Penn State before losing to Michigan in the championship game. They received an at-large bid to the NCAA tournament as the No. 2 seed in the East region. They defeated Cal State Fullerton in the First Round, but lost starting center Isaac Haas to a fractured elbow. Without Haas, they defeated Butler in the Second Round to advance to the Sweet Sixteen where they lost to No. 3 seed Texas Tech.

Previous season
The Boilermakers finished the 2016–17 season 27–8, 14–4 to win the Big Ten regular season championship. In the Big Ten tournament, they lost in the finals to Michigan. They received an at-large bid to the NCAA tournament as the No. 4 seed in the Midwest Region where they beat Vermont and Iowa State to advance to the Sweet Sixteen. In their first trip to the Sweet Sixteen since 2010, they lost to No. 1-seeded and No. 3-ranked Kansas.

Offseason

Departures 
Big Ten Player of the Year Caleb Swanigan declared in April for the NBA draft, but did not immediately sign with an agent.  Isaac Haas and Vincent Edwards also declared for the draft, but also did not sign with an agent. On May 16, 2017, Haas announced he would withdraw from the NBA draft. On May 24, Edwards announced he would return to school. Also on May 24, Swanigan announced he would stay in the NBA draft and not return to school. On June 22, 2017, Swanigan was drafted in the first round (26th overall) by the Portland Trail Blazers.

Incoming transfers

Recruiting classes

2017 recruiting class

2018 recruiting class

World University Games 
In August 2017, Purdue represented Team USA as the national team in the World University Games. They played exhibition games against Team Canada before traveling to Taipei to participate in the Games. Each team was guaranteed to play at least eight games throughout the entire World University Games. Purdue went 5–0 in pool play to advance to the medal round. They defeated Team Israel in the quarterfinals and defeated Team Serbia to advance to the Gold Medal Game against Team Lithuania. In the Gold Medal Game, the Boilers were defeated by Team Lithuania 85–74.

Preseason 
In its preseason rankings, the Blue Ribbon yearbook ranked Purdue as No. 14 in the country.

Roster

Schedule and results
The 2018 Big Ten tournament will be held at Madison Square Garden in New York City. Due to the Big East's use of that venue for their conference tournament, the Big Ten tournament will take place one week earlier than usual, ending the week before Selection Sunday. This could result in teams having nearly two weeks off before the NCAA tournament. 

|-
!colspan=9 style=| World University Games Exhibition
|-

|-
!colspan=9 style=|World University Games 

|-
!colspan=9 style=|Exhibition

|-
!colspan=9 style=| Regular season

|-
!colspan=9 style=|Big Ten tournament

|-
!colspan=9 style=|NCAA tournament

Rankings

^Coaches Poll did not release a Week 2 poll at the same time AP did.
*AP does not release post-NCAA tournament rankings

References

Purdue Boilermakers men's basketball seasons
Purdue
Purdue
Purdue
Purdue